Rompin' and Stompin' is the second studio album by American blues rock guitarist Robert Walker. It was recorded on October 22, 1997 and released on April 14, 1998 by Fedora Records. The album has been considered "congested" and with "unimaginative accompaniments" that give Walker "no room to cut up and go crazy" and that as a result, the album sounds like "any old cover band."

Track listing 
"Baby How Long" (Burnett)  – 3:28
"Take Yo' Hand Off a Me" (Coombs)  – 4:08
"Mustang Sally" (Rice) 4:51
"Cut You a Loose" (London)  – 5:38
"Something on Your Mind" (McNeely)  – 4:48
"Mel's Hideaway" (Walker)  – 4:14
"Shake for Me" (Burnett)  – 4:13
"Moanin' at Midnight" (Burnett, Howlin' Wolf)  – 2:59
"Still a Fool" (Waters)  – 3:35
"Mystery Train" (Parker, Phillips)  – 4:14

Personnel 
Performers:
Jeff Henry — bass
Chris Millar — drums, producer
Clarence Walker — guitar
Robert Walker — guitar, vocals
Production:
Wendi Horowitz — design
Mick Rainsford — liner notes

References 

1998 albums
Robert Walker (musician) albums